Jimmy Brown (born April 28, 1965) is a retired professional tennis player (in both singles and doubles play) from the United States. Brown reached a career-high singles ranking of World No. 42 in November 1983 and was runner-up in 4 ATP Tour singles tournaments. His best result at a grand slam was the third round at the 1984 US Open.

Career finals

Singles (4 runners-up)

References

External links
 
 

American male tennis players
People from Hialeah, Florida
People from Largo, Florida
Tennis people from Florida
1965 births
Living people